Battle of the Planets episodes are listed below in their intended viewing order, recommended by the distributor Sandy Frank Entertainment. The first column on the right lists the production numbers for the original Japanese version Science Ninja Team Gatchaman, while the second column on the right lists the transmission numbers for the original U.S. broadcast of the series.

Episodes

Further reading
 G-Force: Animated

References

External links

Lists of American children's animated television series episodes
Gatchaman episodes